"Be Like That" is a song by American singers Kane Brown, Swae Lee, and Khalid. It was released on July 10, 2020, through RCA Records Nashville as the third single from Brown's third EP Mixtape, Vol. 1.

Background and composition
Brown discussed the song's meaning in a statement to Billboard, saying: "It's about all the different feelings you can have in a relationship. And trying not to overthink it." "Be Like That" mixes country with "infectious" pop and hip-hop elements.

Music video
The lyric video was uploaded on July 10, 2020. The official music video was released on August 19, 2020, and was directed by Alex Alvga. Being set in the 1940s, it features the three singers taking over the Pink Motel in Sun Valley, California and showcasing a classic diner, as well as an empty pool with vintage TVs.

Personnel
Credits adapted from YouTube and Tidal.
Charlie Handsome  – Producer
Denis Kosiak  –  Mixing
Khalif Brown  – Songwriting
Alexander Izquierdo  – Songwriting
James Keely  –  Engineering
Khalid Robinson  –  Songwriting
Randy Lanphear  –  Producer / Vocal Producer
Michael Piroli – Engineering
Kuk Harrell  – Producer / Vocal Producer
Ryan Vojtesak  – Producer / Songwriting
Jeff Braun  – Engineering / Vocal Engineering
Mike Will  – Producer / Songwriting
Dale Becker  – Mastering
Hector Vega - Mastering

Charts

Weekly charts

Year-end charts

Certifications

References

2020 singles
2020 songs
RCA Records Nashville singles
Kane Brown songs
Swae Lee songs
Khalid (singer) songs
Songs written by Kane Brown
Songs written by Swae Lee
Songs written by Khalid (singer)